Kathleen Taylor (born 1966/67) is an American politician from Oregon. A Democrat, she was first elected to the Oregon House of Representatives in 2014 and to the Oregon State Senate in 2016. She represented House District 41, which covers part of southeast Portland and its suburbs, including Milwaukie. She defeated former Milwaukie city councilor Deborah Barnes in the Democratic primary election on May 20, 2014. She was endorsed by outgoing Representative Carolyn Tomei and Oregon Governor John Kitzhaber in her race against Barnes. She lives in Portland.

Professional experience
Taylor is an auditor by trade. She has worked as an auditor for the city of Portland, Multnomah County, and the state of Oregon. She holds a master's degree in public policy from Rutgers University in New Jersey.

References

Democratic Party members of the Oregon House of Representatives
Politicians from Portland, Oregon
Rutgers University alumni
University of Wisconsin–Madison alumni
Living people
County auditors in the United States
Women state legislators in Oregon
Year of birth missing (living people)
Place of birth missing (living people)
21st-century American politicians
21st-century American women politicians
Democratic Party Oregon state senators